Gornji Viduševac is a village in Croatia. It is part of Glina. It is connected by the D31 highway.

References

External links

Populated places in Sisak-Moslavina County
Glina, Croatia